Lyman P. Akins House is a historic house located at Berkshire in Tioga County, New York. It is a Greek Revival style temple-form house built about 1840.

Description and history 
The house consists of a two-story central block with pedimented portico and lower, flanking wings.

It was listed on the National Register of Historic Places on July 2, 1984.

References

Houses on the National Register of Historic Places in New York (state)
Greek Revival houses in New York (state)
Houses completed in 1840
Houses in Tioga County, New York
National Register of Historic Places in Tioga County, New York